Erdoğan Arıca (24 July 1954 – 10 April 2012) was a UEFA Pro Licensed Turkish football manager and coach. As a footballer, he played defender. He was also the brother of the singer Soner Arıca and the nephew of Kadir İnanır.

Career
Arıca played for Malatyaspor (1971–1974), Orduspor (1974–1977), Galatasaray S.K. (1977–1981), Fenerbahçe S.K. (1981–1986), Diyarbakırspor (on loan, 1986–1987) and Sarıyer G.K. (1987–1988) during his playing days. He made 30 appearances for the Turkey national football team from 1977 to 1986. He retired in 1988 and became a football manager and coach. He managed several teams including Çanakkale Dardanelspor, Gaziantepspor, Bursaspor Samsunspor, Çaykur Rizespor, Malatyaspor and Gençlerbirliği.

References

External links

1954 births
2012 deaths
People from Fatsa
Diyarbakırspor footballers
Fenerbahçe S.K. footballers
Galatasaray S.K. footballers
Malatyaspor footballers
Orduspor footballers
Sarıyer S.K. footballers
Turkish football managers
Turkish footballers
Turkey international footballers
Süper Lig managers
Gaziantepspor managers
Çaykur Rizespor managers
Bursaspor managers
Gençlerbirliği S.K. managers
Karşıyaka S.K. managers
Deaths from lung cancer in Turkey
Burials at Ulus Cemetery

Association football defenders